Dangerous is Taiwanese Mandopop boyband SpeXial's third Mandarin studio album. The "Preorder Version" was pre-ordered from 19 August 2015. The first edition "Regular Version" was released on September 11, and the second edition "Deluxe Edition" was released on November 6. The first promotional single, "Love Guardian", is the theme song of online drama School Beauty's Personal Bodyguard. The title track is the Chinese theme song of the film Maze Runner: The Scorch Trials. "The Sweet Boys", the third promotional single, is the promotional theme song of idol drama I Am Sorry, I Love You.

The "Preorder Version" includes a tote bag, and the "Deluxe Edition" includes a 28 cm card figure (one randomly chosen from a selection of eight) and eight 28.5X28.5 cm photo cards.

Track listing

Music videos

References

External links
 SpeXial／《Dangerous》貼身預購版 | 華納線上音樂雜誌
 SpeXial / 第3張正規專輯《Dangerous》 | 華納線上音樂雜誌
 SpeXial /《Dangerous》慶功紀念盤 | 華納線上音樂雜誌

2015 albums
SpeXial albums